Dayton Township is an inactive township in Newton County, in the U.S. state of Missouri.

Dayton Township derives its name from Dayton, Ohio.

References

Townships in Missouri
Townships in Newton County, Missouri